Board Up the House Remixes Volume 3 is the third of five in the Board Up the House Remix Series by Genghis Tron. It was released by Relapse Records on December 9, 2008. The first 1000 copies are on transparent red with blue splatter vinyl and, as usual, Relapse has a run of 100 copies on clear for their staff and friends.  There is no CD version.

Track listing

Danny Lohner's remix is also featured on the official soundtrack of Screen Gems' 2009 movie, Underworld: Rise of the Lycans under his alias Renholder.

References

2008 EPs
Genghis Tron albums